James Caine (1908–1971), English professional footballer.

James Caine may also refer to:

James Caine, of South Tyneside Council election, 2004
Jim Caine (jazz pianist)  (1926–2018), Manx jazz pianist, radio presenter and raconteur.

See also
James Cain (disambiguation)
James Caan (disambiguation)
James Cane (disambiguation)
Jim Kane (disambiguation)
James Cayne businessman